Kimpton is a village in Hertfordshire, England, six miles south of Hitchin, seven miles north of St Albans and four miles from Harpenden and Luton. The population at the 2011 Census was 2,167.

History
Kimpton is mentioned in the Domesday Book: "In the Half-Hundred of HITCHIN 24 Ralph holds KIMPTON from the Bishop. It answers for 4 hides. Land for 10 ploughs. In Lordship 2; a third possible. 2 Frenchmen and 12 villagers with 2 smallholders have 7 ploughs. 3 cottagers; 5 slaves. Meadow for 6 oxen; woodland, 800 pigs; 1 mill at 8s. The total value is and was £12; before 1066 £15. Aelfeva, mother of Earl Morcar, held this manor."

The manor was later held by the Hoo-Keate family, and then by marriage to the Dacre family. The village hall is called Lady Dacre Hall.

Governance

North Hertfordshire District Council

Kimpton Ward is located within the local government district of North Hertfordshire.

The North Hertfordshire District Councillor for Kimpton is Cllr Ralph Muncer (Conservative).

Hertfordshire County Council
Kimpton Ward is located within the Hertfordshire County Council Division of Knebworth and Codicote and is represented by Cllr Richard Thake (Conservative).

Parliamentary Representation

The Ward is represented in Parliament by Bim Afolami MP (Conservative) who was first elected as the MP for Hitchin and Harpenden in 2017.

The Village

The village lies along the valley of a dried-up river bed and is about one mile long. Some of the houses on the High Street date back to the 16th century, but most are 19th and early 20th century. Behind the High Street are two large housing estates built in the 1970s.

The village school is a primary and nursery school with over 150 children.

Parish Church of St. Peter and St. Paul
Kimpton has a spacious flint-built parish church in the unusual transitional style between Norman and Early English. The Dacre Chapel has a fine Perpendicular screen, and the remains of early wall paintings in the chancel show St Christopher and the Seven Corporal Works of Mercy.
The belfry contains a peal of eight bells, the oldest having been cast c.1390.

The Kimpton Flood

In February 2001, Kimpton was hit by flooding due to an unprecedented amount of rainfall. The dried up river Kym, which was now a vital road, emerged again and followed its natural course from Netherfield Springs, through Kimpton and joined the Mimram at Kimpton Mill. The situation became fairly serious on the 24th when business owners from the Industrial Estate on Claggy road and also residents at risk hired pumps and called the Fire Brigade to try to deal with the 1-metre-deep water flow. The total cost of the damage caused by the flood was approximately £500,000. There is evidence suggesting that this is not the only flood to occur in the history of the village. There was a BBC news report on the situation.

References

External links

Kimpton Village Website
Kimpton Scouts Website
Kimpton Art Show

Villages in Hertfordshire
Civil parishes in Hertfordshire
North Hertfordshire District